Lónsöræfi is a wilderness area in south-east Iceland. The region is characterised by its varied geological formations. These mostly date from a period between 5 to 7 million years ago, when the volcano Kollumúlaeldstöðvar  was active. The glacier tongues of the eastern extreme of Vatnajökull also impose themselves on the area. Visible to the north-west is Snæfell  (1833m), the highest peak in Iceland that isn't part of a glacier. The mountains within the area itself include Sauðhamarstindur  (1319m) and Jökulgilstindar  (1313 m).

Lónsöræfi, while less known and less accessible than areas such as Skaftafell and the Southern Highlands, is nevertheless popular with hikers. A transport service from Stafafell  farm into the reserve via all-terrain bus is available. Alternatively, the recent construction of a bridge for walkers over the river Jökulsá í Lóni  at Eskifell  has improved access for hikers. There are mountain huts at Geldingafell , Múlaskáli  and Egilssel  run by regional associations of Ferðafélag Íslands. A 4-6 day walking route from Snæfell to Stafafell is possible via the Eyjabakkajökull  glacier tongue. The area can also be reached from Geithellnadalur . The nearest settlements of any size are Höfn and Djúpivogur.

External links
 Lónsöræfi page of the Icelandic Environment and Food Agency (in Icelandic)
 Ferðafélags Austur-Skaftafellssýslu (in Icelandic)
 Ferðafélag Fljótsdalshéraðs (in Icelandic)
 Account of a trek through Lónsöræfi, with photos (in German)
 Lengthy report into tourism in Lónsöræfi, with photos (in Icelandic)

References 

Southern Region (Iceland)